Enallcochylis is a genus of moths belonging to the family Tortricidae.

Species
Enallcochylis enochra Razowski & Becker, 1986

See also
List of Tortricidae genera

References

 , 2005: World catalogue of insects volume 5 Tortricidae.
 , 2011: Diagnoses and remarks on genera of Tortricidae, 2: Cochylini (Lepidoptera: Tortricidae). Shilap Revista de Lepidopterologia 39 (156): 397-414.
 , 1986, Acta zoologica cracoviensia 29: 469

External links
tortricidae.com

Cochylini
Tortricidae genera